Svenljunga Municipality (Svenljunga kommun) is a municipality in Västra Götaland County in western Sweden. Its seat is located in the town of Svenljunga.

The present municipality was created in 1971 when five municipal units (or parts thereof) were amalgamated. The number of original entities (as of 1863) is 14.

Through the municipality the river Ätran flows in a scenic valley. It flows through the town of Svenljunga, where an old bridge crosses it.

This was the hometown of the great-great-great grandfather of Emma Stone, American actress. In the 18th-century, the village of Mårdaklev in 
Svenljunga Municipality was the home of a trio of sibling textile artists: Sven Erlandsson, Katarina Erlandsdotter and Lisa Erlandsdotter.

References

External links

Svenljunga Municipality - Official site

Municipalities of Västra Götaland County
South Älvsborg